Ed Sheridan is a retired American soccer defender who played professionally in the Major Indoor Soccer League.

Sheridan attended Philadelphia Textile.  He graduated with a bachelor's degree in business with a minor in psychology in 1981.  In 1979, he signed with the Philadelphia Fever of the Major Indoor Soccer League, playing four seasons with the team.  Sheridan continues to live in suburban Philadelphia where he is a sales & marketing manager at Micronic America.

References

External links
 MISL stats

Living people
1957 births
American soccer players
Major Indoor Soccer League (1978–1992) players
Philadelphia Fever (MISL) players
Philadelphia Rams soccer players
Association football fullbacks